Rail Wheel Factory, Yelahanka (RWF) (also known as Wheel and Axle Plant) is a manufacturing unit of Indian Railways, producing wheels, axles and wheel sets of railroad wagons, coaches and locomotives for the use of Indian Railways and overseas customers is situated at Yelahanka, Bangalore in the Indian state of Karnataka.

The unit was started by C. K. Jaffer Sharief, the then Railway Minister, who got this project to Bangalore. It was commissioned in 1984 to manufacture wheels and axles for the Indian Railways.

This factory uses cast steel technology in the manufacturing of wheels which utilizes scrap steel collected from Railways' own workshops as raw material. The products (Wheels, Axles and wheel sets) are engineered with little scope for human errors. It has a planned capacity to manufacture of about 70,000 wheels of different sizes, 23,000 axles and to assemble 23,000 wheel sets. It employs over 2000 personnel and  has an annual turnover of about 82 crores. It is an ISO 9001:2000 and ISO 14001 certified unit for its business processes. It was the first unit of Indian Railways to receive ISO 9001:2008 accreditation.

See also
 Banaras Locomotive Works, Varanasi
 Diesel Locomotive Factory, Marhowrah
 Chittaranjan Locomotive Works, Asansol
 Electric Locomotive Factory, Madhepura
 Integral Coach Factory, Chennai
 Modern Coach Factory, Raebareli
 Rail Coach Factory, Kapurthala
 Rail Wheel Plant, Bela
 Titagarh Wagons, Titagarh
 List of locomotive builders by countries

References 

Coach and wagon manufacturers of India
1984 establishments in Karnataka
Companies based in Bangalore
Rail transport in Karnataka